Sesebi or Sesibi was a New Kingdom Egyptian town on the west bank of the Nile, across from Delgo, Sudan. A temple was built there by Akhenaten, who appointed a viceroy to maintain the structure, govern the local settlement, and secure traffic on the Nile.

References

History of Nubia
Archaeological sites in Sudan